The Sandy Denny discography chronicles the output of British folk rock singer Sandy Denny.  Her brief career, spanning 1967 to 1978, saw the release of 4 solo albums and 4 singles on several record labels.

Denny was the lead singer of the group Fairport Convention, and fronted the band through several of their most highly regarded albums: What We Did on Our Holidays, Unhalfbricking, and Liege & Lief were all released by the band during 1969, and are today considered touchstones in the progression of British folk rock. Fairport guitarist and songwriter Richard Thompson would prove to be an important collaborator in Denny's life, and he would go on to perform guitar duties on each of her solo albums. 

In addition to her work with Fairport Convention, Denny was also a member of The Strawbs, Fotheringay and The Bunch. Other notable recordings include her duet with Robert Plant on Led Zeppelin's "The Battle of Evermore", as well as a brief appearance on a live version of The Who's Tommy. She has received a number of awards and accolades from different organizations.

Solo

Studio albums

Live albums

Compilation albums

Collaboration albums

Singles

With The Strawbs

Studio albums

Collaboration albums

With Fairport Convention

Studio albums

Live albums

Singles

With Fotheringay

Studio albums

Live albums

Compilation albums

Singles

With The Bunch

Studio albums

Singles

Guest appearances

1965, Jackson C. Frank's single "Blues Run the Game" (Columbia); Denny plays tambourine (uncredited) on the B-side, "Can't Get Away From My Love".
1968, The Young Tradition's album Galleries (Transatlantic TRA 172); piano on track 16, "The Pembroke Unique Ensemble"
1970, Stefan Grossman's album The Ragtime Cowboy Jew (Transatlantic) backing vocals in the chorus of "A Pretty Little Tune"
1971, Iain Matthews' (then: Ian Matthews) album If You Saw Thro' My Eyes (Vertigo), his first solo album, she duets on the aforementioned track and provides piano, harmonium and backing vocals to three other tracks.
1971, "The Battle of Evermore" on Led Zeppelin's fourth album, where she sings a duet with Robert Plant; in the footnotes of that album's sleeve notes, she is credited and has her own rune symbol of three triangles much like the symbols chosen by the other members of Led Zeppelin.
1972, four tracks on the soundtrack LP to the film Swedish Fly Girls produced by Manfred Mann Water Mother, What Will I Do With Tomorrow, Are The Judges Sane? and I Need You. Denny's tracks were recorded in 1969 at Maximum Sound.
1972, two tracks, "Here In Silence" and "Man of Iron" for the film Pass of Arms released as a 7" soundtrack single with picture sleeve.
1972, Richard Thompson's album Henry the Human Fly; piano on track 8 and backing vocals on tracks 4 and 5.
1972, stage version of the Who's Tommy performed with the London Symphony Orchestra; Denny plays the nurse and sings "It's a Boy"
1975, Charlie Drake's "You Never Know" single for Charisma Records (CB270), produced by Peter Gabriel

References

Denny, Sandy